The 6th Lancers is an armoured regiment of the Pakistan Army. Previously, it was known as the 6th Duke of Connaught's Own Lancers (Watson's Horse), and was a regular cavalry regiment in the British Indian Army. It was formed in 1921 by amalgamation of the 13th Duke of Connaught's Lancers (Watson's Horse) and the 16th Cavalry. The regiment and its predecessors have seen active service on the North West Frontier, in Egypt during 1882, in China during the Boxer Rebellion, the two World Wars and the Indo-Pakistani War of 1965. On the Partition of India in 1947, the regiment was allotted to the Pakistan Army, where it remains in service today.

13th Duke of Connaught's Lancers (Watson’s Horse)
The 13th Duke of Connaught's Lancers was originally raised in Sep 1857, at Lahore, as the 4th Sikh Irregular Cavalry by Lieutenants H Cattley and John Watson VC. Watson was appointed the commandant but did not join until 1860. He would go on to command the regiment for eleven years and is better known for introducing changes in the riding practices of the cavalry, whereby the rider would rise in the stirrups during the trot instead of bumping along in the saddle. The regiment served in the Second Afghan War of 1878–80 and in Egypt in 1882, where it fought against Arabi Pasha at the Battle of Tel-el-Kebir. It so impressed the Duke of Connaught that he requested his mother, Queen Victoria, to appoint him as their Colonel-in-Chief. In 1897, the regiment was engaged in suppressing the tribal uprisings on the Northwest Frontier. During the First World War, the regiment remained on the Northwest Frontier until July 1916, when it moved to Mesopotamia for the relief of Kut-al-Amara. On its return, it served in Waziristan during the Third Afghan War in 1919.

1857 4th Sikh Irregular Cavalry
1861 13th Regiment of Bengal Cavalry
1861 13th Regiment of Bengal Cavalry (Lancers)
1874 13th Regiment of Bengal Lancers
1884 13th (Duke of Connaught's) Regiment of Bengal Lancers
1901 13th (Duke of Connaught's) Bengal Lancers
1903 13th Duke of Connaught's Lancers
1904 13th Duke of Connaught's Own Lancers (Watson's Horse)

16th Cavalry
The 16th Cavalry was raised as the Rohilcund Horse at Haldwani in 1857 and spent the next two years pacifying the Rohilkhand. In 1864, the regiment was sent to conquer Bhutan as part of the Bhutan Field Force. It was disbanded in 1882 when three regiments were broken up to provide an additional, fourth squadron for the other regiments. However, fears of a Russian invasion led to the approval for an increase in strength of the cavalry and the 16th Cavalry was reformed in 1885 at Ambala. In 1900, the regiment went to China to relieve the international legations in Peking during the Boxer Rebellion. On relieving the American Legation, the 16th Cavalry was presented with the United States flag, which had flown over the building and, for many years, it had hung in the Officers' Mess. During the First World War, the 16th Cavalry served in the Mesopotamian Campaign. After the war, it served in the Third Afghan War of 1919.

1857 Rohilcund Horse
1861 16th Regiment of Bengal Cavalry
1864 16th Regiment of Bengal Cavalry (Lancers)
1874 16th Regiment of Bengal Lancers
1882 Disbanded
1885 16th Regiment of Bengal Cavalry (re-raised)
1901 16th Bengal Lancers
1903 16th Cavalry

6th Duke of Connaught’s Own Lancers (Watson’s Horse)
After the First World War, the number of Indian cavalry regiments was reduced from thirty-nine to twenty-one. However, instead of disbanding the surplus units, it was decided to amalgamate them in pairs. This resulted in renumbering and renaming of the entire cavalry line. The 13th Duke of Connaught's Lancers (Watson's Horse) and 16th Cavalry were amalgamated at Meerut on 1 June 1921 as the 13th/16th Cavalry; becoming the 6th Duke of Connaught's Own Lancers a year later. Their uniform was blue with scarlet facings, while the new badge was to be crossed lances with the figure '6' on the intersection and a scroll below, reading 'The Duke of Connaught's Own'. Their composition was one squadron each of Punjabi Muslims, Sikhs and Dogras.

During the Second World War, the 6th Duke of Connaught's Own Lancers, now mounted on armoured cars, served as the Reconnaissance Regiment of the 10th Indian Infantry Division and later with the 8th Indian Infantry Division in the Italian Campaign. The regiment was engaged in a number of actions, most notably the Second Battle of Cassino, Monte Moro, crossing of the Rivers Po and Adige and the race to Venice. In August 1947, on the Partition of India, the 6th DCO Lancers was allotted to Pakistan. The regiment's Jat Squadron went to the 7th Light Cavalry in exchange for their Punjabi Mussalman Squadron, while the Sikh Squadron was exchanged with the Punjabi Mussalmans of the 8th King George V's Own Light Cavalry.

In 1956, Pakistan became a republic and all titles pertaining to the British royalty were dropped. The regiment's new designation was 6 Lancers. During the Indo-Pakistani War of 1965, 6 Lancers spearheaded the Pakistan Army's advance in the Kasur Sector and captured the Indian town of Khem Karan under the dynamic leadership of their Commandant, Lieutenant Colonel Sahib Zad Gul, who fell in battle while leading his regiment.
1921 13th/16th Cavalry (amalgamation)
1922 6th Duke of Connaught's Own Lancers
1927 6th Duke of Connaught's Own Lancers (Watson's Horse)
1956 6 Lancers

Battle honours
Afghanistan 1878–80, Tel-el-Kebir, Egypt 1882, Punjab Frontier, China 1900, Shaiba, Kut al Amara 1915, Ctesiphon, Tigris 1916, Baghdad, Kut al Amara 1917, Sharqat, Mesopotamia 1915–18, NW Frontier, India 1915, Afghanistan 1919, The Trigno, Tuffilo, The Sangro, The Moro, Cassino II, Pignataro, Liri Valley, The Senio, Santerno Crossing, Italy 1943–45, Khem Karan 1965.

Affiliations and alliances
 Light Dragoons

See also
 6th Lancers (India)

Notes

Further reading
 Brock, Maj F. (1948).The 6th Duke of Connaught's Own Lancers in Italy. Published privately.
 Gaylor, John. (1991). Sons of John Company: The Indian and Pakistan Armies 1903- 1991. Stroud: Spellmount Publishers Ltd. 
 Cardew, FG. (1903). A Sketch of the Services of the Bengal Native Army to the Year 1895.  Calcutta: Military Department.
 Harris, RG, and Warner, C. (1979). Bengal Cavalry Regiments 1857–1914. London: Osprey Publishing. .
 Elliott, Maj Gen JG. (1968). The Frontier 1839–1947: The Story of the North-West Frontier of India. London: Cassell.
 Trench, CC. (1988). The Indian Army and the King’s Enemies, 1900–1947. London: Thames and Hudson.
 Rikhye, Maj Gen Indar Jit. (2003). 6th Duke of Connaught's Own Lancers. Charlottesville: University of Virginia.

External links
6th Duke of Connaught’s Own Lancers (Watson’s Horse) by John Gaylor at The Defence Journal

British Indian Army cavalry regiments
Honourable East India Company regiments
Armoured regiments of Pakistan
Indian World War I regiments
Indian World War II regiments
Military units and formations established in 1857
1857 establishments in India